Category 5 cable (Cat 5) is a twisted pair cable for computer networks. Since 2001, the variant commonly in use is the Category 5e specification (Cat 5e). Cat 5 is also used to carry other signals such as telephone and video.

This cable is commonly connected using punch-down blocks and modular connectors. Most Category 5 cables are unshielded, relying on the balanced line twisted pair design and differential signaling for noise rejection.

Standards 
The specification for category 5 cable is defined in ISO/IEC 11801, IEC 61156 and  EN 50173.

The specification for category 5 cable was defined in ANSI/TIA/EIA-568-A, with clarification in TSB-95. These documents specify performance characteristics and test requirements for frequencies up to 100 MHz.

The cable is available in both stranded and solid conductor forms. The stranded form is more flexible and withstands more bending without breaking. Patch cables are stranded. Permanent wiring used in structured cabling is solid-core. The category and type of cable can be identified by the printing on the jacket.

The category 5 specification requires conductors to be pure copper. The industry has seen a rise in non-compliant / counterfeit cables, especially of the Copper Clad Aluminum (CCA) variety. This has exposed the manufacturers or installers of such fake cable to legal liabilities.

Variants and comparisons 
The category 5e specification improves upon the category 5 specification by revising and introducing new specifications to further mitigate the amount of crosstalk. The bandwidth (100 MHz) and physical construction are the same between the two, and most Cat 5 cables actually meet Cat 5e specifications, though they are not specifically certified as such. The category 5 was deprecated in 2001 and superseded by the category 5e specification.

The Category 6 specification improves upon the Category 5e specification by extending frequency response and further reducing crosstalk. The improved performance of Cat 6 provides 250 MHz bandwidth. Category 6A cable provides 500 MHz bandwidth. Both variants are backward compatible with Category 5 and 5e cables.

Termination 

Cable types, connector types and cabling topologies are defined by ANSI/TIA-568. Nearly always, 8P8C modular connectors (often referred to incorrectly as RJ45 connectors) are used for connecting category 5 cable. The cable is terminated in either the T568A scheme or the T568B scheme. The two schemes work equally well and may be mixed in an installation so long as the same scheme is used on both ends of each cable.

Applications 
Category 5 cable is used in structured cabling for computer networks such as Ethernet over twisted pair. Through the use of power over Ethernet (PoE), power can be carried over the cable in addition to Ethernet data.

Cat 5 is also used to carry other signals such as telephony and video. In some cases, multiple signals can be carried on a single cable; Cat 5 can carry two conventional telephone lines as well as 100BASE-TX in a single cable. The USOC/RJ-61 wiring standard may be used in multi-line telephone connections. Various schemes exist for transporting both analog and digital video over the cable. HDBaseT  is one such scheme.

Characteristics 
The use of balanced lines helps preserve a high signal-to-noise ratio despite interference from both external sources and crosstalk from other pairs.

Insulation 
Outer insulation is typically polyvinyl chloride (PVC) or low smoke zero halogen (LS0H).

Bending radius 
Most Category 5 cables can be bent at any radius exceeding approximately four times the outside diameter of the cable.

Maximum cable segment length 
The specifications for 10BASE-T networking specify a 100-meter length between active devices. This allows for 90 meters of solid-core permanent wiring, two connectors and two stranded patch cables of 5 meters, one at each end.

Conductors 
Since 1995, solid-conductor UTP cables for backbone cabling is required to be no thicker than 22 American Wire Gauge (AWG) and no thinner than 24 AWG, or 26 AWG for shorter-distance cabling. This standard has been retained with the 2009 revision of ANSI TIA/EIA 568.

Although cable assemblies containing  are common, category 5 is not limited to 4 pairs.

Individual twist lengths 
The distance per twist is commonly referred to as pitch. Each of the four pairs in a Cat 5 cable has differing precise pitch to minimize crosstalk between the pairs. Each pair has different twist lengths based on prime numbers so that no two twists ever align. The pitch of the twisted pairs is not specified in the standard. Measurements on one sample of Cat 5 cable yielded the following results.

Since the pitch of the various colors is not specified in the standard, pitch can vary and should be measured for the batch being used if the cable is being used in a non-Ethernet situation where pitch may be critical.

Environmental ratings 

Some cables are "UV-rated" or "UV-stable" meaning they can be exposed to outdoor UV radiation without significant degradation.

Plenum-rated cables are slower to burn and produce less smoke than cables using a mantle of materials like PVC. Plenum-rated cables may be installed in plenum spaces where PVC is not allowed.

Shielded cables (FTP or STP) are useful for environments where proximity to RF equipment may introduce electromagnetic interference, and can also be used where eavesdropping likelihood should be minimized.

References

Further reading
 

Ethernet cables
Transmission lines